The black-chested jay (Cyanocorax affinis) is a species of bird in the family Corvidae.

The head, face, and chest are mostly black with violet-blue spots above and below the eye, as well as a violet-blue malar stripe. The underparts are white as is the tip of the tail, while the upperparts and wings are mainly dark violet-blue.

It is found in Colombia, northwestern Venezuela, Panama and far eastern Costa Rica.

Its natural habitats are subtropical or tropical dry forests, subtropical or tropical moist lowland forests, and heavily degraded former forest.

References

External links

 
 
 
 
 
 

black-chested jay
Birds of Panama
Birds of Colombia
Birds of Venezuela
black-chested jay
black-chested jay
Taxonomy articles created by Polbot